Epiphyas iodes is a species of moth of the family Tortricidae. It is found in Australia, where it has been recorded from South Australia.

References

Moths described in 1910
Epiphyas